Caprella mendax is a species of skeleton shrimp in the genus Caprella.

References

Corophiidea
Crustaceans described in 1903